The 2004 Peach Bowl, part of the 2003–04 bowl game season, featured the Clemson Tigers and the Tennessee Volunteers.

Clemson scored first on an 8-yard touchdown run from Duane Coleman, giving Clemson a 7–0 lead. Aaron Hunt kicked a 23-yard field goal, giving Clemson a 10–0 lead. Tennessee quarterback Casey Clausen threw a 19-yard touchdown pass to Chris Hannon, pulling Tennessee to 10–7. In the second quarter, Chad Jasmin scored on a 15-yard touchdown run, giving Clemson a 17–7 lead. A 30-yard touchdown pass from Clausen to Mark Jones put Tennessee to within 17–14. Kyle Browning scored an 8-yard touchdown run on a variation of the fumblerooski to give Clemson a 24–14 halftime lead. In the fourth quarter, Hunt drilled a 28-yard field goal for the final points of the game to give Clemson the 27–14 win.

References

Peach Bowl
Peach Bowl
Clemson Tigers football bowl games
Tennessee Volunteers football bowl games
January 2004 sports events in the United States
2004 in sports in Georgia (U.S. state)
2004 in Atlanta